The 2018 Richmond upon Thames London Borough Council Election took place on 3 May 2018 to elect members of Richmond upon Thames London Borough Council in England, on the same day as other local elections. The previous time the seats were up for election was 22 May 2014.

Summary of results

Ward results

Barnes

East Sheen

Fulwell & Hampton Hill

Ham, Petersham & Richmond Riverside

Hampton

Hampton North

Hampton Wick

Heathfield

Kew

Mortlake & Barnes Common

North Richmond

South Richmond

South Twickenham

St Margarets & North Twickenham

Teddington

Twickenham Riverside

West Twickenham

Whitton

By-elections between 2018 and 2022

East Sheen

Hampton Wick

References

2018 London Borough council elections
2018